Channel is Deep & Beech is the first album of Croatian hip hop group, Ugly Leaders. It is also the first Croatian hip hop album. The album was released in 1992.

Track listing

References

External links 
Ugly Leaders - Channel is Deep & Beech at Discogs
Listen Channel is Deep & Beech at YouTube
Artist: Ugly Leaders

Ugly Leaders albums
1992 debut albums